The men's trios competition at the 2014 Asian Games in Incheon was held on 27 and 28 September 2014 at Anyang Hogye Gymnasium.

Schedule
All times are Korea Standard Time (UTC+09:00)

Results

References 

Results at ABF Website

External links
Official website

Men's trios